Miguel Anselmo Álvarez de Abreu y Valdéz (born 1711 in La Laguna) was a Spanish clergyman and bishop for the Roman Catholic Archdiocese of Antequera, Oaxaca. He was ordained in 1749. He was appointed bishop in 1751. He died in 1774.

References 

1711 births
1774 deaths
Spanish Roman Catholic bishops
People from San Cristóbal de La Laguna